Deltote musta, the small mossy lithacodia moth, is a moth of the family Noctuidae. The species was first described by Augustus Radcliffe Grote and Coleman Townsend Robinson in 1868. It is found in the US from New Hampshire to Florida, west to Arizona and north to Wisconsin.

The wingspan is 15–19 mm. Adults have dark greenish forewings with blackish shading and lines. The reniform spot is round or broadly oval, white with reddish-brown and white filling. The hindwings are gray. Adults are on wing from May to September.

References

Moths described in 1868
Acontiinae